Toshack Highway is the musical group formed by the lead singer and guitarist from Swervedriver, Adam Franklin.
The band name derives from merging the surnames of two Liverpool F.C. football players from the 1970s, John Toshack and Steve Heighway.

History
The first full length debut, Toshack Highway and released by Catapult Records in the U.S. and Flower Shop in Europe in 2000, showcased a full band sound of electric keyboards and bubbly Moog synthesizers played through guitar effects pedals over acoustic and electric guitars. Half the record was instrumental, but punctuated by spaceman samples and German language spoken vocals – the other half featured Franklin’s laconic vocal drawl on more conventional folk pop workouts and the album was dubbed 'Spacefolk' by one reviewer.

The second release was an EP of four-track recordings titled Everyday, Rock'n'Roll Is Saving My Life released by Space Baby in 2001, much more a back to basics affair with Franklin on his own playing simple melodic pop songs accompanied by electric and acoustic guitars, shakers, double-tracked vocals and the compression of the tape machine.
 
Release three was a split CD album with Canadians Sianspheric on their Hamilton, ON label Sonic Unyon entitled Magnetic Morning. Reunited with the drummer and producer of the first eponymous release, this five-song release contains elements of folk, country, psychedelia and in "The Streets That Spin Off" came close to an old Swervedriver theme: ‘songs about cars that rock’.

A fourth download only EP called Birdsong EP was released in April 2006 by the Oxford label, Shifty Disco.

Members
Adam Franklin (vocals, guitars, songs, instrumentals, keyboards, shakers, kitchen sinks)
Locksley Taylor (bass, guitar, keyboards, leafs)
Charlie Francis (production, bass, keyboards, fine cuisine)
Jeff Townsin (drums, big hair)
Will Foster (piano, a drink or two)
Ron Lowder (drums, southern drawl)
Mike Taylor (piano, sideburns)
Andrew Lindsay (bass, rye & coke)
Matt Durrant (drums, falling off drums)

Discography

References

External links
Official website
My Space's Band Web Page

British electronic musicians